Ilya Vadimovich Derzhinsky (born 16 March 2004) is a Russian football player.

Club career
He made his debut in the Russian Football National League for FC Dynamo Bryansk on 20 March 2021 in a game against PFC Krylia Sovetov Samara.

References

External links
 Profile by Russian Football National League
 

2004 births
Living people
Russian footballers
Association football forwards
FC Dynamo Bryansk players
Russian First League players